Kayak to Klemtu is a Canadian drama film, directed by Zoe Leigh Hopkins and released in 2017. The film stars Ta'Kaiya Blaney as Ella, a teenage First Nations girl from Vancouver who decides following the death of her uncle Bear (Evan Adams) to take up his activism against a proposed pipeline development, and undertakes a 500-kilometre kayak trip to the family's ancestral home at Klemtu to testify at the pipeline hearings.

The film's cast also includes Sonja Bennett, Carmel Armit, Tyler Burrows, Jared Ager-Foster and Lorne Cardinal.

The film premiered on October 20, 2017, at the imagineNATIVE Film and Media Arts Festival, where it won the Audience Choice Award. It went into commercial release in 2018.

At the 2018 Leo Awards, Blaney won the award for Best Actress and Bennett won the award for Best Supporting Actress.

References

External links
 

2017 films
2017 drama films
Canadian coming-of-age drama films
First Nations films
Films shot in British Columbia
Films set in British Columbia
Films directed by Zoe Leigh Hopkins
2010s English-language films
2010s Canadian films